Hwang Chiyeul (born 3 December 1982) is a South Korean singer. Outside his career as a solo artist, he has also hosted Immortal Songs 2 and competed in the Chinese version of singing competition show I Am a Singer. He made his official debut in 2007, releasing a digital single album, Chi Yeul (치열) and a full-length studio album, Five Senses (오감).

In March 2015, he appeared on I Can See Your Voice on Mnet Korea. His success on the show became the turning point in his life, and since then he has appeared on other TV shows such as Immortal Songs: Singing the Legend, Radio Star, I Live Alone, Knowing Bros, Happy Together. Hunan TV in China invited him to participate in I Am a Singer (season 4). On 13 June 2017, his first mini album, Be Ordinary was released and it led him to be the best selling solo artist in the first half of the year.

Early life 
Hwang was born and grew up in Gumi, North Gyeongsang Province in South Korea on 3 December 1982, the youngest of three children born to Hwang, an engineer and Park. As a teenager, he was obsessed with dancing (B-boying), but he always wanted to become a singer.
On September 24, 2004, he moved to Seoul to become a musician. In 2007, he made his official debut, releasing two albums and appearing in some TV and radio shows for about a year, but his career came to a halt because his management company closed. He spent his twenties working part-time jobs and taught at music schools as a vocal coach, teaching idol bands including Infinite, After School, Lovelyz, NU'EST, and Hello Venus.
Since he appeared on I Can See Your Voice on Mnet in 2015, he has been one of the most active Korean celebrities as singer, host of TV-shows and awards, guest on various TV-shows, advertising model, brand ambassador.

Discography

Studio albums

Extended plays

Singles

Soundtrack appearances

Filmography

Awards and nominations

References

External links 

 
 
 

K-pop singers
1982 births
Living people
People from Gumi, North Gyeongsang
South Korean pop singers
South Korean male web series actors
21st-century South Korean male singers